Charles David Carter (August 16, 1868 in Chickasaw – April 9, 1929) was a Native American politician elected as U.S. Representative from Oklahoma, serving from 1907 to 1927. During this period, he also served as Mining Trustee for Indian Territory, 1900–1904, appointed by President William McKinley.

Carter had earlier served as auditor for the Chickasaw Nation and was elected to the Chickasaw Council. He also served as superintendent of Chickasaw Schools.

Biography
Born near Boggy Depot, Choctaw Nation, Indian Territory (now Oklahoma), Carter moved with his father to Mill Creek, a stage stand on the western frontier of the Chickasaw Nation, in April 1876. Carter was of Chickasaw and Cherokee descent. He attended the Indian day schools and Chickasaw Manual Training Academy at Tishomingo.

He was employed on a ranch from 1887 to 1889 and in a mercantile establishment in Ardmore, Oklahoma, from 1889 to 1892. He married Ada Gertrude Wilson on December 29, 1891 and they had four children, Stella LeFlore, Italy Cecil, Julia Josephine, and Benjamin Wisnor Carter, Jr. After Ada's death on January 30, 1901, he married Cecile Whittington Jones on January 8, 1911.

Public service
Carter served as auditor of public accounts of the Chickasaw Nation 1892-1894, a member of the Chickasaw Council in 1895, then superintendent of schools of the Chickasaw Nation in 1897. He was appointed mining trustee of Indian Territory by President William McKinley in November 1900 and served four years.

Carter was Secretary of the first Democratic executive committee of the proposed State of Oklahoma from June to December 1906. Upon the admission of Oklahoma as a State into the Union, he was elected as a Democrat to the Sixtieth and to the nine succeeding Congresses, serving from November 16, 1907, to March 4, 1927.

Carter served as chairman of the Committee on Indian Affairs (Sixty-fifth Congress). He was an unsuccessful candidate for renomination in 1926. He was appointed to the State highway commission, serving 1927-1929.

Death
Carter died in Ardmore, Carter County, Oklahoma, on April 9, 1929. He is interred at Rose Hill Cemetery in Ardmore.

See also
 List of Native Americans in the United States Congress

References

External links
Charles David Carter Profile and Videos - Chickasaw.TV
 

 Encyclopedia of Oklahoma History and Culture - Carter, Charles

|-

|-

1868 births
1929 deaths
20th-century American politicians
Chickasaw people of Cherokee descent
Chickasaw people
Democratic Party members of the United States House of Representatives from Oklahoma
Native American members of the United States Congress
People from Atoka County, Oklahoma
Members of the Society of American Indians